Eois memorata is a moth in the  family Geometridae. It is found from the Indian subregion to Sundaland. The habitat consists of lowland areas, usually disturbed or secondary forests.

References

Moths described in 1861
Eois
Moths of Asia